Are Media is an Australian media company that was formed after the 2020 purchase of the assets of Bauer Media Australia, which had in turn acquired the assets of Pacific Magazines, AP Magazines and Australian Consolidated Press during the 2010s. It is owned by the Sydney investment firm Mercury Capital.

History

Australian Consolidated Press
Consolidated Press was formed in 1936, combining ownership of The Daily Telegraph and Frank Packer's Australian Women's Weekly. It was renamed Australian Consolidated Press (ACP) in 1957, and acquired The Bulletin in 1960.

The Daily Telegraph was sold to News Limited in 1972; the same year ACP founded Cleo and took over Publishers Holdings (including Australian House & Garden, Wheels, and others). Two years later, Frank Packer died, and his son Kerry took over the company.

In 1988, ACP acquired John Fairfax's magazines (including Woman's Day, People, Dolly, and  Good Housekeeping).

In 1994, ACP merged with the Nine Network to form Publishing & Broadcasting Limited. In 2000, Australian Consolidated Press was rebranded ACP Magazines.

In 1999, PBL acquired Crown Limited, and in 2002, it combined ACP and Nine into a new division, PBL Media. CVC Capital Partners acquired PBL Media in 2007.

In 2011, ACP sold its magazines in Singapore, Malaysia and Indonesia to Singapore Press Holdings.

Pacific Magazines

Pacific Magazines was a magazine publisher operating in Australia, owned by Seven West Media. It was acquired by Bauer Media Australia in April 2020. In June 2020, Mercury Capital acquired Pacific Magazines as part of its purchase of Bauer's former Australian and New Zealand assets.

Bauer Media Australia and New Zealand

In September 2012, Nine Entertainment announced that it had agreed to sell ACP Magazines to the German multinational publishing company Bauer Media for an estimated A$500 million, with the sale completed on 1 October 2012.  ACP was rebranded as Bauer Media Australia.

The publisher had many tie-ins with other Nine Entertainment Co. companies, such as Nine Network programs (Burke's Backyard and Good Medicine) and the Magshop web service, which is now operated by Bauer Media Group.

In October 2019, Bauer agreed terms to purchase Pacific Magazines from Seven West Media. The transaction was completed in May 2020 after the Australian Competition & Consumer Commission cleared the sale. 

In April 2020, several titles temporarily ceased publication due to the onset of the COVID-19 pandemic.

Mercury Capital
In June 2020, the Sydney investment firm Mercury Capital purchased Bauer Media's Australian and New Zealand print and digital assets covering women's entertainment and lifestyle; fashion, beauty and health; food; and the motoring and trader lifestyle categories. Some New Zealand brands acquired by Mercury Capital included the New Zealand Woman's Weekly, the New Zealand Listener, and North and South.  Notable Australian assets acquired by the company include Woman's Day, The Australian Women's Weekly, Rolling Stone Australia, Cleo, Dolly, and Pacific Magazines.

In mid-July 2020, Mercury Capital announced that it would resume publishing several former Bauer titles including Woman's Day, the New Zealand Woman's Weekly, The Australian Women's Weekly NZ, home category magazine Your Home & Garden, current affairs weekly New Zealand Listener, Air New Zealand's in-flight magazine Kia Ora, the Property Press, and the websites Now to Love, Homes to Love and Beauty Heaven. However, Mercury Capital closed down several publications including NW and Good Health, and the Australian editions of Elle, Harper's Bazaar, InStyle, Men's Health, OK!, Women's Health. In addition, Mercury Capital sold the New Zealand titles Metro to independent publisher Simon Chesterman and North & South to independent publishers Konstantin Richter and Verena Friederike Hasel respectively.

In late September 2020, Bauer Media Australia was rebranded as Are Media. As part of the rebrand and relaunch, the company's CEO Brendon Hill confirmed that Are Media would be relaunching several titles including the New Zealand Woman's Weekly, New Zealand Listener, Woman's Day, The Australian Women's Weekly, Your Home and Garden, and Air New Zealand's inflight magazine Kia Ora.

Brands

Entertainment and lifestyle/health
The Australian Women's Weekly
Better Homes and Gardens
Better Homes Diabetic Living
Family Circle
New Idea
Now To Love
Take 5 
That's Life! 
TV Week" 
Who 
Woman's Day

Fashion and beauty
BEAUTYcrew
beautyheaven
Elle
Girlfriend 
Marie Claire

Homes
Australian House & Garden
Belle 
The Block
Country Style
Home Beautiful
Homes to Love
Inside Out
Real Living

Food
Cooking with the Australian Woman's Weekly
Gourmet Traveller
New Idea Food

Parenting
Bounty
Practical Parenting

Auto
4X4 Australia
Australasian Bus & Coach (ABC)
Australasian Transport News (ATN)
Deals on Wheels
Earthmovers & Excavators
Farms & Farm Machinery
Motor 
Owner Driver
Street Machine
Unique Cars
Wheels 
WhichCar

New Zealand
Kia Ora: Air New Zealand Inflight magazine
The Australian Women's Weekly New Zealand Edition
New Zealand Listener
New Zealand Woman's Weekly
NEXT magazine/Now To Love
Woman's Day
Your Home and Garden

References

External links
Are Media official website
Are Media New Zealand website

ACP magazine titles
 
Bauer Media Group
Magazine publishing companies of Australia
Mass media companies of Australia
Mass media in Sydney
Mercury Capital
Publishing companies established in 1936
1936 establishments in Australia
Australian companies established in 1936